Khana Poshtan may refer to:
 Khana Poshtan, Langarud
 Khana Poshtan, Rudsar